Following the release of the Computer World album, Kraftwerk went on a subsequent tour, that started on 24 May 1981 in Florence, Italy; and ended on 14 December 1981 in Oyten, Bremen, Germany. The tour took place across, Western, Central and Eastern Europe, North America, and Asia-Pacific.

Set lists

Tour Dates

References

Kraftwerk
1981 concert tours